, there were about 42,000 electric vehicles in Oregon.

Government policy
The state initially had a $1,500 tax rebate for electric vehicle purchases, which was repealed in 2013.

In January 2022, the state government announced a $7,500 tax rebate for electric vehicle purchases. The rebate applies to households with an annual income between $51,000 and $251,000.

In 2021, the state government enacted a law requiring that 20% of parking spaces for new commercial and residential buildings be equipped for electric vehicle charging.

Charging stations
The Infrastructure Investment and Jobs Act, signed into law in November 2021, allocates  for electric vehicle charging stations in Oregon.

, the state government recognizes seven "Alternative Fuel Corridors" along major highways, with charging stations located at least once every ; these highways are I-5, I-82, I-84, US-20, US-26, US-97, and US-101.

By region

Medford
, Jackson County had about 900 electric vehicles, a majority of which were registered in Ashland.

Portland
In 2016, Portland was ranked the most electric-car-friendly city in the United States by Indiana University.

References

Road transportation in Oregon
Oregon